Noble Babu Thomas (born 30 May 1984) is an Indian film producer, screenwriter, and actor who works in Malayalam films. He started his career as a film producer and founded the film production company Big Bang Entertainments in 2015. His debut production was Jacobinte Swargarajyam (2016), starring Nivin Pauly and directed by Vineeth Sreenivasan. The film grossed ₹25 crore (US$3.6 million) at the box office and completed 100 days in Kerala.

Noble made his acting debut in Helen (2019), produced by Vineeth Sreenivasan. He was also one among its writers, along with Alfred Kurian Joseph and Mathukutty Xavier. The film was a survival thriller and his character Azhar was widely recognized. His debut directorial was the music video album titled Made in Heaven, in which he also played the lead role. Currently he is the creative director of the upcoming movie Mili starring Janhvi Kapoor.

Early life
Noble was born to Babu Thomas and Suma Babu in Thiruvalla, Kerala. He attended Sacred Heart Higher Secondary School, Thevara. He did his Bachelor's in Electrical and Electronics Engineering from KCG College of Technology, Chennai. It was during that time he met Vineeth Sreenivasan and Aju Varghese, who were his batchmates. During his college days he had a keen interest in acting and therefore got into modelling. He later completed graduation from Vogue Institute of Fashion Technology, Bangalore.

Career
After founding Big Bang Entertainments in 2015, Noble's debut film production venture was Jacobinte Swargarajyam starring Nivin Pauly and directed by Vineeth Sreenivasan. The film went on to become a commercial success, grossing ₹25 crore (US$3.6 million) at the box office and completed 100 days in Kerala. In 2018, he co-produced Aravindante Athidhikal with Pradeep Kumar starring Vineeth Sreenivasan and directed by M. Mohanan. Noble's third production venture was Helen (2019) in which he marked his debut as an actor. The film was also his debut as a screenwriter, along with Alfred Kurian Joseph and Mathukutty Xavier. He co-produced the film along with Vineeth Sreenivasan's production company Habit of Life. His performance earned him positive reviews from critics; Litty Simon of Malayala Manorama said, “Noble makes his acting debut as Helen's lover and justifies his role in every aspect”. Sajin Shrijith of The New Indian Express noted that Noble “makes a solid impression with his acting debut”. In 2021, he turned director and starred in a music video album titled Made in Heaven. In 2022, he co-produced Hridayam starring Pranav Mohanlal and also appeared briefly in it. He has also served as creative director for the movie Mili starring Janhvi Kapoor which is the Bollywood remake of Helen. His next film Philp’s was announced in January 2022.

Filmography

References

Malayali people
Malayalam film producers
Film producers from Kerala
Businesspeople from Kerala
21st-century Indian businesspeople
Living people
1984 births